Minuscule 869 (in the Gregory-Aland numbering), Cι21 (von Soden), is a 12th-century Greek minuscule manuscript of the New Testament on paper, with a commentary. The manuscript has no complex context.

Description 

The codex contains the text of the Gospel of John (6:20-11:57) on 245 paper leaves (size ), with one lacuna. The text is written in one column per page, 25 lines per page. The biblical text is surrounded by a catena.

Text 
Kurt Aland did not place the Greek text of the codex in any Category.

History 

F. H. A. Scrivener dated the manuscript to the 11th or 12th century, C. R. Gregory dated it to the 12th century. Currently the manuscript is dated by the INTF to the 17th century.

The manuscript was added to the list of New Testament manuscripts by Scrivener (684e) and Gregory (869e). Gregory saw it in 1886.

Currently the manuscript is housed at the Vatican Library (Gr. 1996), in Rome.

See also 

 List of New Testament minuscules
 Biblical manuscript
 Textual criticism
 Minuscule 868

References

Further reading

External links 
 

Greek New Testament minuscules
12th-century biblical manuscripts
Manuscripts of the Vatican Library